Cassola may refer to:

 Cassola, town in the province of Vicenza, Veneto, Italy
 Cassola (surname), surname of Italian origin
 Cassola, typical winter dish popular in Northern Italy

See also 

 Casola (disambiguation)
 Cazzola (disambiguation)